Metin Depe (born November 10, 1981 in Samsun) is a former Turkish football defender.

External links
 
 
 Guardian Stats Centre

1981 births
Living people
Turkish footballers
İstanbul Başakşehir F.K. players
Süper Lig players

Association football defenders